Gary Butler may refer to:

 Gary Butler (linebacker) (born 1984), American football linebacker
 Gary Butler (tight end) (born 1951), American football tight end
 Gary C. Butler, CEO and president of Automatic Data Processing